Ringo Starr: Live at Soundstage is a 2007 live album by English rock drummer and singer Ringo Starr.  It was recorded at the Genesee Theatre in Waukegan, Illinois on 24 June 2005 as part of the PBS concert series Soundstage. The Roundheads for this performance were: Steve Dudas (lead guitar), Gary Burr (guitar), Mark Hudson (guitar), Matt Bissonette (bass guitar), Mark Hart (keyboards) and Gregg Bissonette (drums). Colin Hay and his wife Cecilia Noel joined in on the "With a Little Help From My Friends" finale.

Ringo Starr: Live at Soundstage features many of Starr's best-known songs, both as a solo artist and as a member of the Beatles. The tracks include "Yellow Submarine", "Octopus' Garden", "Photograph" and songs from his two previous studio albums, Choose Love and Ringo Rama.

Track listing

Live show setlist
"With a Little Help from My Friends" / "It Don't Come Easy" (Lennon/McCartney; Richard Starkey)
"Octopus's Garden" (Starkey)
"Choose Love" (Starkey, Hudson, Burr)
"I Wanna Be Your Man" (Lennon/McCartney)
"Down Under" (Colin Hay)
"Waiting for My Real Life to Begin" (Hay, feat. Cecilia Noël)
"Don't Pass Me By" (Starkey)
"I'm the Greatest" (John Lennon)
"Give Me Back the Beat" (Starkey, Hudson, Burr, Dudas, Grakal)
"Memphis in Your Mind" (Starkey, Hudson, Burr, Dudas, Grakal)
"Photograph" (Starkey, Harrison)
"Never Without You" (Starkey, Hudson, Nicholson)
"Back Off Boogaloo" (Starkey)
"Boys" (Dixon, Farrell)
"Who Can It Be Now?" (Hay)
"You Can't Do That" (Lennon/McCartney)
"Long Tall Sally/I'm Down/Oh! Darling" (Hudson)
"Yellow Submarine" (Lennon/McCartney)
"Act Naturally" (Russell, Morrison)
"With a Little Help from My Friends" (Lennon/McCartney) (feat. Hay and Noel)

Personnel 
 Ringo Starr - drums, percussion, vocals, producer
 Gary Burr - electric guitar, mandolin, backing vocals
 Mark Hudson - electric and acoustic guitar, harmonica, backing vocals, producer
 Steve Dudas : electric guitar
 Matt Bissonette - bass guitar, backing vocals
 Mark Hart - keyboards, backing vocals
 Gregg Bissonette - drums, backing vocals
with special guests:
 Colin Hay, Cecilia Noel - backing vocals on finale

References

2007 live albums
Ringo Starr live albums
Albums produced by Ringo Starr
Albums produced by Mark Hudson (musician)